WWEG (106.9 FM, "106.9 The Eagle") is a commercial FM radio station licensed to serve Myersville, Maryland. The station is owned by Manning Broadcasting, Inc. and broadcasts a classic hits format.

The station's service contour covers portions of the "Four-State Region" of western Maryland, South Central Pennsylvania, eastern West Virginia and northern Virginia.

WWEG uses HD Radio and broadcasts an adult contemporary format on its HD2 subchannel, branded as "102.1 More FM", which is simulcast on translator W271BV in Hagerstown, Maryland. The station also broadcasts a classic country format on its HD3 subchannel, branded as "93.5 & 100.5 Max Country", which is simulcast on translators W228AM in Frederick, Maryland, and W263CR in Halfway, Maryland. The HD4 subchannel is a simulcast of talk formatted WARK AM.

History
The station signed on for the first time in 1954 with the WARK-FM call sign. In 1976, the call sign was changed to WWCS, standing for "Country Sunshine", an automated country format it ran at the time. In a market dominated with country stations (WYII & WAYZ), WWCS struggled in the ratings even though it had the most powerful broadcast signal.

On October 6, 1982, WWCS became WXCS, dropping its country format for Album Oriented Rock using the branding "107 X Marks The Rock". 107 X was a hit immediately, although its popularity waned as the "AOR" format struggled in the 80's.

On March 1, 1985, the call sign was changed to WARX, the AOR format was switched to soft adult contemporary and the station rebranded as "Magic 106.9".

In early 1991, the station switched to an oldies format with a branding change to "Oldies 106.9".

On March 1, 2005, nearby Waynesboro, Pennsylvania-based WWMD (now WBHB-FM) had switched from Contemporary Hit Radio to classic rock with the WEEG call sign and a branding change to "Eagle 101.5". On March 9, 2005, Nassau sued WEEG owner Verstandig Broadcasting for the use of the "Eagle" branding, even though Verstandig had been using the name prior to Nassau's purchase of WARX. However, Nassau had been operating WARX under an LMA since January 1, 2005. WARX was changed to the Eagle at 11 am Sunday, February 27, before Eagle 101.5 switched later that same afternoon. On March 9, Verstandig dropped the "Eagle" branding and changed WEEG's calls to WFYN. On March 10, 2005, owner Manning Broadcasting sold WARX to Nassau Broadcasting. Nassau changed WARX's calls to WWEG the same day.

In 2008, the city of license was changed to Myersville, Maryland.

Because of the lawsuit against Verstandig, ratings for WWEG were weak at the beginning but have improved. WFYN, which now airs an active rock format as WBHB-FM, consistently ranked higher than WWEG, except during the ratings cycle in the Summer of 2009.

After Nassau went into chapter 11 bankruptcy protection, WWEG and WARK, along with WAFY in Frederick, were purchased by Manning Broadcasting in May 2012, with the sale being completed on November 1, 2012 at a price of $6.4 million. Manning's repurchase of WWEG and WARK followed a lawsuit against Nassau over missed payments.

Translators
The following three translators simulcast the programming of WWEG-HD2 or HD3:

References

External links

WEG